Darren Davies may refer to:
Darren Davies (Australian footballer) (born 1965), Australian rules footballer
Darren Davies (Welsh footballer) (born 1978), Welsh footballer who played for Greenock Morton and Stirling Albion and now coaches in Australia

See also
Darren Davis (disambiguation)